Charles Walter Carrington (1859–1941) was Dean of Christchurch from 1913 to 1927.

He was born in Bath and educated at the University of Cambridge. After an earlier career as an engineer he was ordained in 1888. After a curacy in Notting Hill he was Mission Chaplain to the Bishop of Lichfield then Vicar of Christ Church, West Bromwich. He was Principal of the Upper Department at Christ's College, Christchurch until his appointment as Dean.

He died on 30 July 1941. One of his sons, Philip, was Bishop of Quebec and Metropolitan of Canada; while another, Christopher, died in the First World War. His son Charles fought in both World Wars and became Professor of Commonwealth Relations at the Royal Institute of International Affairs.

References

External links 
 

1859 births
People from Bath, Somerset
Alumni of the University of Cambridge
English engineers
Deans of Christchurch
1941 deaths